Anna Senjuschenko (1961/1962 – 1979) was an Australian soccer player who won four unofficial caps for the Australia women's national soccer team.

Senjuschenko was an elegant central defender, noted for her powerful shooting. At the 1978 Women's World Invitational Tournament, she was named Australia's best player and named to the team of the tournament. The following year she was involved in a fatal traffic accident, while travelling as a passenger in a car in central Perth. In 1996 Senjuschenko was named to the Football Hall of Fame Western Australia.

Anna's brother Alex Senjuschenko was also a soccer centre-half and Football Hall of Fame Western Australia member. Their parents were Russian and moved to Australia in the early 1950s. Alex died in April 2012.

References

1979 deaths
Australian women's soccer players
Australia women's international soccer players
Soccer players from Perth, Western Australia
Sportswomen from Western Australia
Women's association football defenders
Australian people of Russian descent
Road incident deaths in Western Australia
Year of birth uncertain